Linton Johnson III (born June 13, 1980) is an American professional basketball player. He is married to a woman from Caserta, and has Italian citizenship.

Linton Johnson is the nephew of former NBA player Mickey Johnson.

Career
After a four-year college career at Tulane University, he began his professional career in 2003–04 as an undrafted free agent playing 41 games including 20 starts for the Chicago Bulls. He also played for the Charlotte Bobcats, San Antonio Spurs, New Jersey Nets, New Orleans Hornets and the Phoenix Suns, with whom he signed a 10-day contract late in the 2007–08 season. The Suns did not renew his contract, and on March 27, 2008, Johnson signed another 10-day contract with the Toronto Raptors. After the contract expired, Johnson re-signed with the Suns on April 16, 2008.

On March 11, 2009, Johnson was signed to the first of two 10-day contracts by the Chicago Bulls. It was his second stint with the Bulls. He was signed for the remainder of the season after initially being released when his second 10-day contract expired. He was waived on July 30, 2009.

In September 2009, Johnson signed with the Orlando Magic. He was waived on October 28, 2009.

In August 2010 he signed with the Italian pro team Air Avellino.

On July 9, 2013, he signed with Dinamo Sassari. He parted ways with them on January 22, 2014. Next day he signed with Pallacanestro Varese.

In August 2014 he signed a one-year deal with the Italian team Giorgio Tesi Group Pistoia. On January 22, 2015, he was released by Pistoia Basket.

On March 18, 2016, he signed with Juvecaserta Basket for the rest of the 2015–16 Serie A season.

On October 19, 2016, he signed with Scafati Basket for the rest of the 2016–17 Serie A2 season. On January 24, 2017, he left Scafati and returned to Juvecaserta Basket.

NBA career statistics

Regular season 

|-
| style="text-align:left;"| 
| style="text-align:left;"| Chicago
| 41 || 20 || 17.9 || .355 || .212 || .595 || 4.5 || .7 || .9 || .8 || 4.2
|-
| style="text-align:left; background:#afe6ba;"| †
| style="text-align:left;"| San Antonio
| 2 || 0 || 7.5 || .000 || .000 || .000 || 1.5 || .0 || .5 || .0 || .0
|-
| style="text-align:left;"| 
| style="text-align:left;"| New Jersey
| 9 || 0 || 3.9 || .500 || .000 || .250 || .8 || .2 || .2 || .0 || 1.2
|-
| style="text-align:left;"| 
| style="text-align:left;"| New Orleans/Oklahoma City
| 27 || 7 || 18.1 || .403 || .361 || .739 || 4.3 || .4 || .4 || .4 || 5.3
|-
| style="text-align:left;"| 
| style="text-align:left;"| New Orleans/Oklahoma City
| 54 || 0 || 13.3 || .489 || .333 || .811 || 3.0 || .3 || .6 || .3 || 4.2
|-
| style="text-align:left;"| 
| style="text-align:left;"| Phoenix
| 6 || 0 || 8.8 || .500 || .500 || .000 || 2.2 || .5 || .0 || .2 || 2.5
|-
| style="text-align:left;"| 
| style="text-align:left;"| Toronto
| 2 || 0 || 5.0 || .400 || .000 || 1.000 || .5 || .5 || .0 || .0 || 3.0
|-
| style="text-align:left;"| 
| style="text-align:left;"| Charlotte
| 2 || 0 || 6.5 || .000 || .000 || .000 || .0 || .0 || .0 || .0 || .0
|-
| style="text-align:left;"| 
| style="text-align:left;"| Chicago
| 8 || 0 || 5.3 || .364 || .500 || .000 || 1.0 || .3 || .1 || .0 || 1.1
|- class="sortbottom"
| style="text-align:center;" colspan="2"| Career
| 151 || 27 || 14.0 || .416 || .305 || .699 || 3.3 || .4 || .6 || .4 || 3.9

Playoffs 

|-
| style="text-align:left;"| 2009
| style="text-align:left;"| Chicago
| 3 || 0 || 3.3 || .500 || .000 || 1.000 || 1.3 || .3 || .0 || .0 || 1.3
|- class="sortbottom"
| style="text-align:center;" colspan="2"| Career
| 3 || 0 || 3.3 || .500 || .000 || 1.000 || 1.3 || .3 || .0 || .0 || 1.3

Notes

External links
Italian League profile
Career Stats at Basketball-Reference.com
NBA.com profile
ACB.com profile

1980 births
Living people
20th-century African-American people
21st-century African-American sportspeople
African-American basketball players
American expatriate basketball people in Canada
American expatriate basketball people in Italy
American expatriate basketball people in Spain
American men's basketball players
Basketball players from Chicago
Charlotte Bobcats players
Chicago Bulls players
Dinamo Sassari players
Juvecaserta Basket players
Liga ACB players
Naturalised citizens of Italy
New Jersey Nets players
New Orleans Hornets players
Pallacanestro Varese players
Phoenix Suns players
Pistoia Basket 2000 players
Rockford Lightning players
San Antonio Spurs players
Saski Baskonia players
Small forwards
Toronto Raptors players
Tulane Green Wave men's basketball players
Undrafted National Basketball Association players